Klyuchevsky District is an administrative and municipal district (raion), one of the fifty-nine in Altai Krai, Russia. It is located in the west of the krai. Its administrative center is the rural locality (a selo) of Klyuchi. As of the 2010 Census, the total population of the district was 18,267, with the population of Klyuchi accounting for 48.7% of that number.

Geography
Klyuchevsky District is located on the western border Altay Krai, on flat steppe landscape, with 26 significant lakes.  There are no major rivers in through the district. 52% of the area is arable land in crops,  another 20% used in pasture, and the southwest corner of the district is forested.  Klyuchevsky District is about 350 km southwest of the city of Novosibirsk, 280 km west of the regional city of Barnaul, and 2,600 km east of Moscow.  The area measures 60 km (north–south), and 60 km (west–east); total area is 3,042 km2 (about 2% of Altai Krai).  The administrative center is the town of Kluchi in the west-center of the district, on the one major road running north–south through the district.

The district is bordered on the north by Kulundinsky District, on the east by Rodinsky District, on the south by Mikhaylovsky District, and on the west by Pavlodar Region of Kazakhstan.

References

Notes

Sources

Districts of Altai Krai